The Yankee Fork Salmon River is a  tributary of the Salmon River in Custer County, Idaho in the United States.

See also
List of rivers of Idaho

References

Rivers of Idaho
Tributaries of the Salmon River (Idaho)
Rivers of Custer County, Idaho